Jos Devlies is a Belgian medical doctor and an expert in eHealth at the European Institute for Health Records (EuroRec).

He graduated in Family Medicine at the Catholic University of Leuven in 1969 and in Occupational Healthcare at the University of Ghent in 1972. In addition he obtained a degree in the Management of Healthcare Data in 2003.

Jos Devlies worked full-time as a General Practitioner, for over 30 years, and worked for several years part-time in Occupational Healthcare, especially in the public sector, he started to be an entrepreneur. He has founded and chaired several companies. He is co-author of the Belgian certification criteria for GP EHR systems. Together with Georges De Moor and Geert Thienpont, he is the author of the 2006 eHealth strategy and implementation activities in Belgium report.

Sources
 MedNet 2007
 EuroRec
 Technische gevolgen van de functies van het Electronisch Medisch Dossier (Dutch)

See also
 Belgian Medical Informatics Association

References

Belgian businesspeople
Belgian general practitioners
Flemish physicians
Ghent University alumni
Health informaticians
Living people
Year of birth missing (living people)
Place of birth missing (living people)